The River Valley League is a high school athletic league in California, United States, that is part of the CIF Southern Section. Member schools are located in Riverside. Moreno Valley High School left the league to join the Mountain Valley League.

Members
 Hillcrest High School Trojans
 La Sierra High School Eagles
 Norte Vista High School Braves 
 Patriot High School Warriors
 Ramona High School Rams
 Arlington High School Lions

References

CIF Southern Section leagues